Grand Prix is a 1934 British sports drama film written and directed and produced by St. John Legh Clowes and L.S. Stock,  and starring John Stuart, Gillian Sande, Milton Rosmer and Peter Gawthorne.

Plot
A racing car driver accidentally kills his fiancée's father.

Cast
 John Stuart – Jack Holford
 Gillian Sande – Jean McIntyre
 Peter Gawthorne – John McIntyre

References

External links
 
 

1934 films
British sports drama films
1930s sports drama films
British auto racing films
British black-and-white films
1934 drama films
1930s English-language films
1930s British films